"Tired of Being Alone" is a soul song written by American singer Al Green. It reached number 11 on the Billboard Hot 100 and number seven on the Soul Singles Chart in 1971. Billboard ranked it as the number-12 song for 1971.

Background
Though released on the 1971 album, Al Green Gets Next to You, the song was written in late 1968 and intended to be released on the 1969 album, Green Is Blues. Problems occurred with the first recording, so it was postponed for production. It was altered and perfected the second time around.

"Tired of Being Alone" was produced and recorded by Willie Mitchell at Hi Records and mixed by Mitchell and Terry Manning. In 1973, Green performed the song with Chicago on the TV special Chicago in the Rockies. In 2002, this recording appeared as a bonus track on the remastered version of Chicago VI.

In 2004, Green's version was ranked number 293 on Rolling Stones list of The 500 Greatest Songs of All Time.

Charts

Certifications

Texas version

In 1992, Scottish band Texas covered "Tired of Being Alone", which became a substantial hit in the United Kingdom, reaching number 19 on the UK Singles Chart. A re-recorded version later appeared on their 2000 album, The Greatest Hits.

Track listings
7-inch single (TEX 8)
 "Tired of Being Alone" – 3:17
 "Wrapped in Clothes of Blue" – 4:18

CD1 (TEXCD 8 / 866 883-2)
 "Tired of Being Alone" – 3:17
 "Thrill Has Gone" – 4:25
 "In My Heart" (12") – 6:36
 "Prayer for You" – 6:51

CD2 'Acoustic EP' (TEXCB 8 / 866 769-2)
 "Tired of Being Alone" – 3:02
 "Walk the Dust" – 5:11
 "Why Believe in You" – 3:32
 "Return" – 2:34
 Limited edition of 5000 copies (in oversized packaging), includes three exclusive black and white postcards.

Charts

Other noteworthy versions
 "Tired of Being Alone" has been covered by other artists. Among the more successful is American singer Sybil who released the song as a non-album single in 1996, peaking at number 53 in the UK.

References

1971 singles
1971 songs
1992 singles
Al Green songs
Texas (band) songs
Songs written by Al Green
Song recordings produced by Willie Mitchell (musician)